The Fuji T-1 was Japan's first jet-powered trainer aircraft. Its first flight was in January 1958. A total of 66 T-1 planes were built. It was retired in March 2006.

Design and development
After World War II, Japanese aircraft industry was banned from research as well as the destruction of materials and equipment related to aircraft. In 1952, a partial ban on aircraft research was lifted, making it possible to develop Japan's own domestic jet aircraft. In the spring of 1954, the Defense Agency's plan to develop a training jet aircraft emerged, which later lead to the development of the T-1 training plane.

The T-1 was the first indigenously designed Japanese jet aircraft to be developed since World War II. It was Japan's first mass-produced jet and the first aircraft to apply a swept wing. The development of a domestic jet engine was not completed in time, so the T-1A was powered by the British-designed Bristol Siddeley Orpheus turbojet and made its first flight on May 17, 1960. The T-1B was powered by the Ishikawajima-Harima J3 turbojet and 20 were produced between June 1962 and June 1963. Fuji was the successor to the Nakajima Aircraft Company (famous for building several aircraft such as Nakajima Ki-43 and Nakajima Ki-84 during WW2). The first aircraft of Fuji's own design was the T-1 jet trainer.

More than 200 T-1s were to be produced, but with the introduction of the Lockheed F-104J/DJ fighters, the education system changed and the Lockheed T-33A, which was in large numbers, took on the same role, and only 66 T-1s were introduced.

With the entry into service of its successor, the Kawasaki T-4, flight training with the T-1 was completed in December 2000. The last T-1 was retired on March 3, 2006.

Variants

Data from: Simpson 2001, p. 246
T1F1  powered by a Nippon J3 engine.
T1F2 Two prototypes, powered by  Bristol BOr.1 Orpheus engines.
T1F3 Initial designation for the production T-1A, powered by   Bristol BOr.4 Orpheus engines.
T-1A Powered by a 17.79 kN (4,000 lbf) Bristol Siddeley Orpheus Mk 805 turbojet engine. The original designation was T1F3. 46 built.
T-1BPowered by an 11.77 kN (2,645 lbf) Ishikawajima-Harima J3-IHI-3 turbojet engine. 20 built.
T-1C  Converted to 13.72 kN (3,085 lbf) Ishikawajima-Harima J3-IHI-7 engines.

Operators

 Japan Air Self Defense Force

Aircraft on display

 T-1B 25-5856 at Tokorozawa Aviation Museum, Saitama Prefecture
 T-1B 35-5870 at Saitama Subaru Sakitama Garden, Gyōda, Saitama Prefecture
 T-1B 05-5810 at Kakamigahara Air and Space Museum

Specifications (T-1A)

See also

References
Citations

Bibliography

 Donald, David and Jon Lake. Encyclopedia of World Military Aircraft. London:Aerospace Publishing, 1996, Single Volume Edition. .
 
 Taylor, John W. R. Jane's All The World's Aircraft 1965-66. London:Sampson Low, Marston, 1965.

External links

T-001
1950s Japanese military trainer aircraft
Single-engined jet aircraft
Low-wing aircraft
F-86 Sabre
Aircraft first flown in 1958